Serabit el-Khadim (also transliterated Serabit al-Khadim, Serabit el-Khadem) is a locality in the southwest Sinai Peninsula, Egypt, where turquoise was mined extensively in antiquity, mainly by the ancient Egyptians. Archaeological excavation, initially by Sir Flinders Petrie, revealed ancient mining camps and a long-lived Temple of Hathor, the Egyptian goddess who was favoured as a protector in desert regions and known locally as the mistress of the turquoise. The temple was first established during the Middle Kingdom in the reign of Sesostris I (reigned 1971 BC to 1926 BC) and was partly reconstructed in the New Kingdom.

Archaeological findings

Thirty incised graffiti in a "Proto-Sinaitic script" shed light on the history of the alphabet. The mines were worked by prisoners of war from southwest Asia who presumably spoke a Northwest Semitic language, such as the Canaanite that was ancestral to Phoenician and Hebrew. The incisions date from the beginning of the 16th century BC. After a century of study and the initial publication by Sir Flinders Petrie, researchers agree on the decipherment of a single phrase, cracked in 1916 by Alan Gardiner: לבעלת  (to the Lady—[ (Lady) being a title of Hathor and the feminine of the title  (Lord) given to the Semitic god]—although the word  (loved) is frequently cited as a second word.

The script has graphic similarities with the Egyptian hieratic script, the less elaborate form of the hieroglyphs. In the 1950s and 1960s it was common to show the derivation of the Canaanite alphabet from hieratic, using William Albright's interpretations of Proto-Sinaitic as the key. It was generally accepted that the language of the inscriptions was Semitic, that the script had a hieratic prototype and was ancestral to the Semitic alphabets, and that the script was itself acrophonic and alphabetic (more specifically, a consonantal alphabet or abjad). The word  (Lady) lends credence to the identification of the language as Semitic. However, the lack of further progress in decipherment casts doubt over the other suppositions, and the identification of the hieratic prototypes remains speculative.

Romanus François Butin of Catholic University of America published articles in the Harvard Theological Review based on the 1927 Harvard Mission to Serabit and the 1930 Harvard-Catholic University Joint Expedition. His article "The Serabit Inscriptions: II. The Decipherment and Significance of the Inscriptions" provides an early detailed study of the inscriptions and some dozen black and white photographs, hand-drawings and analysis of the previously published inscriptions, #346, 349, 350–354, and three new inscriptions, #355–368. At that time, #355 was still in situ at Serabit but had not been photographed by the previous Harvard Mission. In 1932, he wrote: "The present article was begun with the limited purpose of making known the new inscriptions discovered by the Harvard-Catholic University Joint Expedition to Serabit in the spring of 1930. In the course of this study, I perceived that some signs doubtful in the inscriptions already published were made clear by the new slabs, and I decided to go over the entire field again." Both articles provide an analysis of the Proto-Sinaitic inscriptions during earlier expeditions to the site.

See also
 Dophkah

References

Sources

External links

 Serabit el-Khadem, Institute of Archaeology of Tel Aviv

Archaeological sites in Egypt
Egyptian mythology
Egyptology
Open-air museums in Egypt
Proto-Sinaitic script
Hathor